Prays alpha is a moth of the family Plutellidae. It is found in Japan (including Hokkaido island) and has also been recorded from China.

The wingspan is 11–16 mm.

References

 , 2011, A taxonomic review of Prays Hübner, 1825 (Lepidoptera: Yponomeutoidea: Praydidae) China with descriptions of two new species. Tijdschrift voor Entomologie 154 (1): 25-32.

Plutellidae
Moths of Japan
Moths described in 1977